"Don't Touch Me There" is a song written by Michael P. Heeney, and recorded by American country music artist Reba McEntire for her 1986 studio album Whoever's in New England. In March 1987, a version by American country music artist Charly McClain was released as the first single from her studio album Still I Stay. McClain's version reached number 20 on the Billboard Hot Country Singles & Tracks chart.

Chart performance

References

1987 singles
1986 songs
Reba McEntire songs
Charly McClain songs
Songs written by Michael P. Heeney
Epic Records singles